The Augustus Hurt house, often erroneously cited as the Howard House, was General Sherman's temporary headquarters during the Battle of Atlanta. After the battle the house was torn down for firewood.

The neighborhood was razed for the site of a freeway interchange which was never built, and is now the site of the Carter Center.

References

 Augustus Hurt House, historical marker
 Augustus Hurt Plantation historical marker

Houses in Georgia (U.S. state)
Demolished buildings and structures in Atlanta
Houses completed in 1858